Zalog pod Sveto Trojico is a small dispersed settlement east of Domžale in the Upper Carniola region of Slovenia.

Name
The name of the settlement was changed from Zalog pod Sveto Trojico (literally, 'Zalog below Holy Trinity') to Zalog pod Trojico (literally, 'Zalog below Trinity')  in 1955. The name was changed on the basis of the 1948 Law on Names of Settlements and Designations of Squares, Streets, and Buildings as part of efforts by Slovenia's postwar communist government to remove religious elements from toponyms. The name Zalog pod Sveto Trojico was restored in 1992.

References

External links

Zalog pod Sveto Trojico on Geopedia

Populated places in the Municipality of Domžale